Alex Faith (born December 27, 1989) is an American hip hop singer-songwriter born and raised between the Cabbagetown enclave of Atlanta, Georgia and Riverdale, just south of Atlanta, GA. He was formerly a member of the rap collective W.L.A.K.

Background
Alex Faith was born on December 27, 1989, in Riverdale, Georgia and raised in the Cabbagetown community.

History
Faith first appeared on Sho Baraka's Barakology mixtape in 2009. He is a member of the collective W.L.A.K. In 2012, Faith released a mixtape entitled Honest 2 God. In 2013, Faith released his first studio album with Collision Records entitled ATLast. His second studio album, Bloodlines, was released on October 30, 2015, from Collision Records.

He released, Southern Lights: Overexposed, with Dre Murray on April 28, 2015, by Collision Records.

Discography
Studio albums

References

External links
 

1989 births
American male rappers
Living people
American performers of Christian hip hop music
Rappers from Atlanta
21st-century American rappers
21st-century American male musicians